Kiki Bertens and Johanna Larsson were the defending champions, but Bertens chose not to participate. Larsson played alongside Kirsten Flipkens and successfully defended the title, defeating Raquel Atawo and Anna-Lena Grönefeld in the final, 4–6, 6–4, [10–5].

Seeds

Draw

Draw

References
 Main Draw

Upper Austria Ladies Linz - Doubles
Upper Austria Ladies Linz Doubles